Bushkill Park is an amusement park located in Easton, Pennsylvania, generally geared toward younger audiences, although most of it is not currently open. The facility operated continuously from 1902 to 2004 and during the summer of 2006, and was then closed until January 2017, when the roller skating rink reopened. In 1933, Thomas Long (1885–1965) leased Bushkill Park, furnishing it with a hand carved carousel that he and his father had purchased. Long bought the park in 1939 and operated it for the rest of his life with his wife, Mabel "Mom" Long. After his death, Mabel operated it with Melvin Heavener until he died in 1986 and then alone until her own death in 1989. The first owner after 1989 was William Hogan and his partner, Neal Fehnel. Fehnel sold his share to Sammy Baurkot, who was already a co-owner; the date of the sale is May 2019.  As of mid-2019, Sammy Baurkot completed his acquisition and is now the sole owner.

Bushkill Park was famous for its antique rides such as bumper cars, "The Whip", "The Haunted Pretzel", and "The Bar'l of Fun." The park has operated two vintage carousels over the years, however the carousel building collapsed in 2014. Bushkill Park is home to the United States of America's oldest funhouse, the "Bar'l of Fun".

In January 2017, the park had reopened its skating rink, the indoor arcade and children's party area. The park currently runs open roller-skating on Friday and Saturday nights, and on Sunday afternoons, in addition to Tuesday nights. Rentals for birthday parties and picnics are also available. At the 115th Birthday celebration on July 9, 2017, rides were not yet operating but plans were revealed for reopening a completely revamped facility with seven or eight fully functioning rides and the funhouse for the 2018 season. In the past, 14 of the 17 rides had been sold, so the owner may be acquiring new ones while renovating those previously considered to have been destroyed.

The park has opened for the 2022 season and celebrated 120 years on July 4.  The Bar'l Of Fun Funhouse (now known as Hilarity Hall) has been restored and opened as well.

The Bar'l of Fun 

The Bar'l of Fun was one of the oldest operating funhouses in the United States, built sometime before 1935. The funhouse is also notable due to the amount of untouched Folk art painted on the walls and on banners inside the building.

Inside the funhouse, aside from the rotating barrel (from which the attraction gets its name), there is a maze-like layout in a dark room with mirrors.  In the past, there was a flashing strobe light in the corner of the room.  Beyond the maze is the famous barrel, a multi-person 'sit-and-spin' style ride, as well as a wobbly staircase.  Upstairs is the Hall of Mirrors, and a rolling walkway that looks out onto the park.  Finally, there is an original antique wooden slide that goes from the second floor to the first. The funhouse was featured on the Discovery Channel in 1997.

Carousels 

Bushkill Park has owned and operated two notable vintage carousels. 

The first was a three row menagerie built by Tom Long’s father and uncle. A 1902 model, it is considered Long Carousel #8 in a series of family-built models. It originally turned at a park on an island near Philadelphia and was brought to Island Park via canal boat in 1912. It traveled to a few parks managed by Long before settling in at Bushkill with Long in the mid 1930s. It remained at Bushkill until Mabel Long’s death in 1989, when the park and carousel were sold separately. Long #8’s last known location was intact in an Ohio warehouse. 

In March 1993, the park purchased a 1915 carousel made by the Allan Herschell Company from the dilapidated Willow Mill Park in Mechanicsburg, Pennsylvania, which opened with the amusement park in 1934 and stopped operating in 1990 when it closed. Along with the carousel, a Wurlitzer band organ that once played at Willow Mill Park was also purchased. Between 2001 and 2007, the carousel was sold, and in the winter of 2014 the carousel building collapsed from a heavy snow load.

Clarifying point:
A 1907-vintage carousel made by the Dentzel Carousel Company was refurbished by Tom Long (and likely his brother, George Long, Sr.). While it never physically turned as a Bushkill Park feature, it was repaired piece by piece in Tom Long’s workshop at the rear of the park. It was sold in 1966 to Centreville Amusement Park in Toronto, Ontario.

Flooding and vandalism 

In 2004, Hurricane Ivan struck, and the park suffered a devastating "100-year flood".  This flood completely destroyed the Haunted Pretzel and a miniature golf course, while inflicting major damage on the park's bumper cars, and its "Whip" ride.  The park did not open at all in 2005 and was hit by flooding again in April 2005 and June 2006. The area remains in a flood zone, being nearly surrounded by the Bushkill Creek. Vandalism that "left the park in shambles" was a serious problem during 2007.

In June 2010, Baurkot reported that they had hired crews to begin cleaning up the park.  No opening date was projected, and progress has been slower than anticipated as the partners waited for additional funds to pay workers.

In the summer of 2010, the park was visited by Mike Wolfe and Frank Fritz of Antique Archaeology.  This visit was featured on their reality TV show, American Pickers, in the third-season premiere episode, "A Banner Pick", which premiered December 6, 2010.  A pair of vintage sideshow banners by Fred G. Johnson were bought from the park for US$700, and sold for US$10,000.  Wolfe and Fritz returned to the park after a visit to New York City and paid an extra $5,000 for the banners because of the unexpected outcome of the Internet auctions for the two banners, and because Wolfe and Fritz were impressed with the attempts to revive the park.

The dilapidated, flood ravaged park was featured in the 2011 horror film The Fields starring Cloris Leachman and Tara Reid.

115th Anniversary celebration 

On July 9, 2017, the park was opened to visitors for its 115th birthday as a fundraiser. Guests were treated to inflatable rides, face painting, fried food, and ticket giveaways for nearby amusement parks. The Bar'l of Fun was also opened for the day. Guests were able to walk around the park, and explore the newly restored clown ride and swan ride, which are both small swing rides for children. A new mascot for the park was shown at the event, Do*more the duck.

The entrance sign and the front of the skating rink were repainted for the occasion. The skating rink received a blue and white pattern with red letters displaying "Skating Rink" painted over top. A restored car from the Whip ride, along with other unrestored cars from previous rides such as the bumper cars and The Haunted Pretzel, were on display for guests to sit in and take pictures in. Silk-screened glass blocks from the collapsed carousel building were for sale for $100 as souvenirs, along with branded T-shirts and mugs. Proceeds from the fundraiser were to benefit the park, and nearly three thousand people attended.

References

External links 

Bushkill Park Official Facebook Page
Bushkill Park Official Home Page (No longer updated)
Topix forum posts from park owner Neil Fehnel
Park operator sues those who evicted him
Bushkill Park owners left with questions, damage

1939 establishments in Pennsylvania
Amusement parks in Pennsylvania
Buildings and structures in Northampton County, Pennsylvania
Easton, Pennsylvania
Tourist attractions in Northampton County, Pennsylvania